Anil (born 3 May 1963) is an Indian film maker who works in Malayalam Cinema. He has been active in the Malayalam film industry from 1989. He directed 31 films in Malayalam language, together with Babu Narayanan under the name Anil–Babu.

Personal life

Anil married national award-winning actress Kalpana in 1998 and later divorced in 2012. Their only daughter Sreemayi lived with Kalpana, until Kalpana's death on 25 January 2016.

Filmography

As a solo director

Anil-Babu

References

External links
 Mantrikan Movie Director Anil talking about his movie YouTube

Living people
20th-century Indian film directors
Malayalam film directors
1963 births
21st-century Indian film directors
Artists from Alappuzha
Film directors from Kerala